Major General Willis A. Nkosi  was a South African Army officer. He served as General Officer Commanding (GOC) South African Army Engineer Formation. and finally as the Chief Director Army Force Structures from 1 March 2018 until his resignation in March 2020.

Early life

Military career 
 Served in Nepal in 2007/8 as a Sector Commander

Awards and decorations

References

 

South African Army generals
Living people
Year of birth missing (living people)